This is a list of the first films by country. This table shows the earliest known film productions by country, or successor state.

List of the first films by country

See also
 History of film
 List of cinema of the world
 List of early color feature films

References

Film-related lists by country